Epigonidae, the deepwater cardinalfishes, are a family of perciform fishes. The family includes about 43 species.

They are found in temperate and tropical oceans throughout the world.

Timeline

Genera
The following genera are included in the Epigonidae:

 Brephostoma Alcock, 1889
 Brinkmannella Parr, 1933
 Epigonus Rafinesque, 1810
 Florenciella Mead & de Falla, 1965
 Microichthys Rüppell, 1852
 Rosenblattia Mead & de Falla, 1965
 Sphyraenops Gill, 1861

References

 
Ray-finned fish families